Nature Immunology is a monthly peer-reviewed scientific journal covering immunology. It was established in 2000, as an expansion of the Nature family of journals. The editor-in-chief is Jamie D. K. Wilson.

According to the Journal Citation Reports, the journal has a 2021 impact factor of 31.250, ranking it 4th out of 161 journals in the category "Immunology".

References

External links

Publications established in 2000
Immunology journals
Nature Research academic journals
Monthly journals
English-language journals